S-TEC may refer to:
 S-TEC Corporation, a US corporation and manufacturer of flight control systems
 Daewoo S-TEC engine, low-displacement engine codeveloped by Suzuki and Daewoo Motors